The Jhang Branch Canal is a canal which originates from the Lower Chenab Canal.The main areas to which it supplies water is Jhang only.

References

See also
 Head Khanki
 Lower Chenab
 Gugera Branch Canal
 Marala Headworks
 Taunsa Barrage
 Indus River
 Rachna Doab

Canals in Pakistan